Cheemalapeta is a village in Peddapalle mandal, Peddapalli district, Telangana, India.

Villages in Peddapalli district